Rayisa Nedashkivska (Ukrainian: Раїса Недашківська Rayisa Nedashkivska, Russian: Раиса Недашковская; 17 February 1943, Malyn, Zhytomyr Oblast, Ukraine) is a Ukrainian and Soviet-era theater and cinema actress.

In 1993 she was awarded People's Artist of Ukraine.

Filmography

References 

1943 births
Living people
Ukrainian stage actresses
Ukrainian film actresses
Soviet stage actresses
Soviet film actresses
People from Malyn
20th-century Ukrainian actresses
21st-century Ukrainian actresses